The Perfect Weapon is a 2020 documentary film directed by John Maggio produced by Ark Media and HBO Documentary Films. Based on the book of the same name by David E. Sanger, the film details the rise of cyberwarfare and cyber spying on an international scale. The film premiered on October 16, 2020 on HBO, including streaming on HBO Max.

References

External links 
 
 

2020 films
2020 documentary films
HBO original programming
American documentary films
2020s English-language films
2020s American films